Scarperia e San Piero is a comune (municipality) in the Metropolitan City of Florence, in the Italian region Tuscany, located about  northeast of Florence. It was created on 1 January 2014 after the merger of former comuni of Scarperia and San Piero a Sieve.

Scarperia is famous for the production of knives by artisanal family companies.
Since 2009, it has been the headquarters of La Marzocco Espresso coffee machine company.
The city is best known as the home of the Mugello Circuit which is located here and it is home to the Italian motorcycle Grand Prix.
On 13 September 2020, the first Grand Prix of Tuscany took place at the Mugello Circuit, Scarperia, as part of the 2020 Formula One World Championship.

References

 
Populated places established in 2014